The Sony Ericsson Xperia mini (model ST15i) is an Android smartphone from Sony Ericsson, released in August 2011. The Xperia mini has a "mobile BRAVIA engine" driving a 320×480 pixels  capacitive touch-screen, a 1 GHz Snapdragon S2 processor, a 5 megapixel camera, 512 MB of onboard RAM, and comes stock with a 2 GB microSD card (compatible with up to 32 GB).

Overview
The Xperia mini (st15i) runs Android 2.3 "Gingerbread" but can be upgraded to Android 4.0, "Ice Cream Sandwich." It was touted as being an ultra-small smartphone that still retained higher-end specifications and performance.

References

External links
 Official website (Xperia Mini)
 Official website (Xperia Mini Pro)
 Specifications at gsmarena.com 

Android (operating system) devices
Sony Ericsson smartphones
Mobile phones introduced in 2011